Les is a given name, usually short for Lester or Leslie. Also, a romanization of Ukrainian name Лесь [ˈlɛsʲ]. Les may refer to:

People:
 Les Baxter (1922–1996), American musician and composer
 Les Blank (1935-2013), American documentary filmmaker
 Les Brown (bandleader) (1912–2001), leader of Les Brown and the Band of Renown
 Les Claypool (born 1963), American bassist and founding member of Primus
 Les Costello (1928–2002), Canadian ice hockey player and Catholic priest
 Les Dodd (born 1954), professional snooker player
 Les Dawson (1931–1993), English comedian
Les Dennis (born 1953), English television presenter
 Les Eaves (born c. 1967), American businessman and state legislator
 Les Edwards (born 1949), British illustrator
 Les Ferdinand (born 1966), English football coach and former player
 Les Gleadell (1921-2009), Falkland Islands civil servant.
 Les Goble (born 1932), American National Football League player
 Les Humphries (born 1940), Founder of the Les Humphries Singers
 Les Kaufman, evolutionary ecologist, Professor of Biology at Boston University
 Les Kurbas (1887-1937), Ukrainian movie and theater director. Considered to be one of the lead figures of the Executed Renaissance
 Les McCann (born 1935), American soul jazz and R&B pianist and vocalist
 Les McKeown (1955–2021), Scottish pop singer, lead singer of the Bay City Rollers
 Les Mills (born 1934), New Zealand shot putter, discus thrower and politician
 Les Palmer (1923–2006), American National Football League player
 Les Paul, stage name of American jazz guitarist and inventor Lester William Polsfuss (1915–2009)
 Les Podervianskyi (born 1952), Ukrainian painter, poet, playwright and performer 
 Les Reed (footballer) (born 1932), Australian rules footballer
 Les Reed (football coach) (born 1952), English football coach and manager
 Les Reed (songwriter) (born 1935), English songwriter, arranger, musician and light orchestra leader
 Les Serdyuk (1940-2010), Soviet and Ukrainian theater and film actor
 Les Shannon (1926–2007), English football player and manager
 Les Stroud (born 1961), Canadian filmmaker and survival expert, creator, writer, producer, director, cameraman and host of the television series Survivorman
 Les Tanyuk (1938-2016), Ukrainian theater and film director, dissident and politician
 Les Tremayne (1913–2003), British radio, film, and television actor

Fictional characters:
 Les, a character and film school graduate in the film The Search for One-eye Jimmy
 Les Battersby, fictional Coronation Street character
 Les, fictional character from the play, and movie, Newsies 
 Les, a fictional character from the movies  Bring It On
 Lifesaver Les, a minor character from Pizza (TV series)

Hypocorisms